Charles Edward Kiefner (November 25, 1869 – December 13, 1942) was a U.S. Representative from Missouri's 13th congressional district.

Born in Perryville, Missouri to German immigrants, Kiefner attended the public school system. He engaged in the retail lumber business and also in road construction. Kiefner served as Mayor of Perryville from 1900 to 1902 and was a member of the Missouri House of Representatives from 1902 to 1908. He served as delegate to the Republican National Convention in 1912 and served on the staff of Governor Arthur M. Hyde from 1920 to 1924.

Kiefner was elected as a Republican to the Sixty-ninth Congress (March 4, 1925 – March 3, 1927).
He was an unsuccessful candidate for re-election in 1926 to the Seventieth Congress. He was elected to the Seventy-first Congress (March 4, 1929 – March 3, 1931). He was an unsuccessful candidate for re-election in 1930 to the Seventy-second Congress. He resumed the lumber and banking business in Perryville, Missouri, until his death on December 13, 1942. He was interred in Home Cemetery.

References

1869 births
1942 deaths
American people of German descent
Mayors of places in Missouri
Republican Party members of the Missouri House of Representatives
People from Perryville, Missouri
Republican Party members of the United States House of Representatives from Missouri